Eshkeri (also Romanized as Eshkerī) is a village in Khafri Rural District, in the Central District of Sepidan County, Fars Province, Iran. At the 2006 census, its population was 16, in 4 families.

References 

Populated places in Sepidan County